Too Tired to Die is a 1998 American-Korean independent comedy-drama film written and directed by Wonsuk Chin and starring Takeshi Kaneshiro (in his first American debut) and Mira Sorvino. The film is about a young Japanese man who learns he has only twelve hours left to live. It was shot in June 1997 and premiered at the Sundance Film Festival on January 20, 1998, in the American Spectrum section.

Cast
 Takeshi Kaneshiro as Kenji
 Mira Sorvino as Death / Jean
 Jeffrey Wright as Balzac Man
 Michael Imperioli as Fabrizio
 Geno Lechner as Pola
 Ben Gazzara as John Sage
 Sandra Prosper as Black Soldier
 David Thornton as Lulu
 Aida Turturro as Fortune Teller 1 & 2 
 Kim Hye-soo as Anouk
 Drena De Niro as Waitress
 Ako as Mother
 Bill Dawes as Dante
 Lauren Fox as Susan
 Jamie Harrold as Air France Airport Clerk

References

External links
 
 
 

1998 films
American independent films
Films about interracial romance
South Korean independent films
Films set in the United States
South Korean comedy-drama films
1998 comedy-drama films
1990s American films